Assiya İpek (born December 5, 1993) is a Turkish weightlifter competing in the 69 kg division.

İpek earned a quota spot for the 2016 Summer Olympics.

References

Living people
1993 births
Place of birth missing (living people)
Turkish female weightlifters
Weightlifters at the 2016 Summer Olympics
Olympic weightlifters of Turkey
21st-century Turkish sportswomen